Beşpınar (literally "five springs" in Turkish) may refer to the following places in Turkey:

 Beşpınar, Beşiri, a village in the district of Beşiri, Batman Province
 Beşpınar, Çınar
 Beşpınar, Demirözü, a small town in the district of Demirözü, Bayburt Province
 Beşpınar, Kovancılar
 Beşpınar, Vezirköprü, a village in the district of Vezirköprü, Samsun Province